The anime, titled KimiKiss: Pure Rouge, aired in Japan between October 6 to March 24, 2008.

Story

Kouichi Sanada wakes from a dream where his younger self was crying. When he goes to answer the door, he finds a beautiful woman standing in front of him. She quickly enters while reacquainting herself with things in the house, and even enters the shower. A confused Kouichi tries to remember if he knew a girl like this in the past; while trying to remember, his friend Kazuki Aihara comes in. A misunderstanding is caused when the girl comes out of the bathroom, but she suddenly realizes who Kazuki is. Kazuki also realizes who the girl is: his and Kouchi's childhood friend, Mao Mizusawa. Finally realizing this, Kouichi welcomes Mao back. When Kouichi's mother begins talking to Mao about her living in France, Kouichi notices how much Mao has changed. The story then continues with them going to the same school. Many relationships are formed with different people during their school years as Mao and Kouchi realize their true feelings for each other while Sakino and Futami develop feelings for Kazuki.

Episodes
US air dates are the dates the Anime Network made them available via video on demand on various cable systems.

References

KimiKiss: Pure Rouge